Fourthcoming is an album by FourPlay String Quartet. Fourthcoming, their fourth album, and their first to be recorded live, was released July 3, 2009.

It follows the trend of their previous album Now to the Future, containing more originals than covers.

Track listing

References 

2009 albums
FourPlay String Quartet albums